José Luis Martínez Gullotta (born 12 January 1984 in San Rafael, Mendoza Province) is an Argentine football goalkeeper currently playing for San Martín Tucumán.

Career

He filled in as the starting goaltender at the end of Torneo Clausura 2008 due to injuries to the top two Racing goaltenders. He kept the starting job into the beginning part of Apertura 2008 until being removed in favor of Pablo Migliore.

In 2010, he was released from Racing and joined second division side Gimnasia y Esgrima de Jujuy.

References

External links
 Argentine Primera statistics
 Racing Club Official Player Profile

1984 births
Living people
Sportspeople from Mendoza Province
Argentine footballers
Association football goalkeepers
Racing Club de Avellaneda footballers
Aldosivi footballers
Gimnasia y Esgrima de Jujuy footballers
Argentine Primera División players